Roman René Ramírez (born June 11, 1988), better known as Rome Ramirez or simply Rome, is an American singer and guitarist best known for playing with Eric Wilson from Sublime in the band Sublime with Rome.

Early life
Ramirez was born and raised in Fremont, California. Both of his parents are of Mexican heritage, his mother being from Guadalajara and his father's parents from Tijuana, but his father relocated the family to Oakland. He first started playing guitar at age 11, and one of the first songs he learned was a Sublime song.

At 18, Ramirez headed to Los Angeles to focus full-time on music. There, he was introduced to one of his idols, Eric Wilson, bassist for Sublime. They became friends and started jamming together at Eric's infamous holiday parties in Long Beach. Within the year, the plan to bring back Sublime had been set into motion.

Sublime With Rome 
In 2008, Rome collaborated with Eric Wilson on a RAWsession video (also at 17th Street Recording Studio) where he played Sublime songs such as "Saw Red" and "Boss DJ", and eventually began to play with the band's two surviving members, Eric and Bud Gaugh.

The trio then went on tour together playing covers of original Sublime material. Sublime with Rome made its debut in 2009 at Cypress Hill's Smoke Out Festival in San Bernardino, California. Ramirez was soon touring steadily with Sublime with Rome, and the trio released their debut album Yours Truly on July 12, 2011. Shortly after, Gaugh left the band and Josh Freese stepped in to play drums. In 2015, they released another album, Sirens. Freese left in 2017 to tour with Sting, and Carlos Verdugo of Tribal Seeds joined the band. They then released a new album in 2019 with producer Rob Cavallo.

Songwriting and Producing 
Rome co-wrote the song "Lay Me Down" with The Dirty Heads and has collaborated with the band on several albums including Sounds of Change, Dirty Heads, Dessert EP and Swim Team.
Rome also worked extensively with Enrique Iglesias on his 10th studio album.

Rome has said in interviews that his influences are Sublime, Muse, Jimi Hendrix, Bad Brains, Nirvana, Led Zeppelin, Public Enemy, The Beastie Boys and Primus.

Rome's promotional solo single, "Dedication," was premiered on the Rolling Stone website May 30, 2012.  "The song's about loving someone who is struggling with getting their life together and eventually having to move on," says Rome. "It's probably some of the most personal stuff I've put in a song.  Sometimes all you need is the right people to pull the best out of you, and that's what I feel happened with the three of us. The right individuals, at the right place and time." His debut solo EP was released on June 12, 2012.

In March 2015, Ramirez appeared on Blues Traveler's album Blow Up the Moon, co writing the song "Castaway" and "Vagabond Blues" with Dirty Heads.

References

Further reading
Interview with Rome Ramirez of Sublime with Rome, NerdSociety.com, April 24, 2010.
Interview with Sublime with Rome, Hearing The Voice, June 11, 2011.

External links
 
 

1988 births
Living people
American rock singers
American rock guitarists
American male guitarists
American musicians of Mexican descent
Singers from California
People from Fremont, California
Lead guitarists
21st-century American singers
21st-century American guitarists
Guitarists from California
21st-century American male singers
Hispanic and Latino American musicians
Sublime with Rome members